The South West African Jung 0-6-2T of 1904 was a narrow gauge steam locomotive from the German South West Africa era.

In 1904, the Otavi Mining and Railway Company in German South West Africa acquired fifteen  locomotives from Arnold Jung Lokomotivfabrik in Germany. Two of them survived the First World War to be taken onto the South African Railways roster in 1922.

The Otavi Railway
Construction of the  narrow gauge Otavi Railway in German South West Africa (GSWA), which heads northeastward from Swakopmund via Usakos and Otjiwarongo, commenced in November 1903. The  line was completed through Otavi and on to Tsumeb in August 1906, with a  branch line from Otavi to Grootfontein. From Swakopmund to Usakos, the line ran more or less parallel and to the north of the original Swakopmund-Windhuk Staatsbahn or Nordbahn, which had been constructed from 1897.

In 1905, a short  branchline was constructed from Onguati near Usakos on the Otavi line to Karibib on the Nordbahn to create an alternative line from Windhoek to the Atlantic Ocean at times when the Nordbahn's section through the Khan River gorge suffered from the occasional flooding.

The Otavi Railway, the longest narrow gauge railway in the world, was an industrial enterprise of the Otavi Mining and Railway Company. The railway was constructed by Messrs. Arthur Koppel and Company at a cost of about £2,400 per mile. The tracks were laid with  steel rails on  steel sleepers.

On 1 April 1910, the Otavi Railway and its assets were purchased by the German Administration for £1,000,000 under a lease agreement in terms of which the mining company would continue to operate the line for a further ten years. As a result, the problematic Khan River section of the Nordbahn line could finally be abandoned.

Manufacturer
The first mainline locomotives for the Otavi Railway were these fifteen  steam locomotives, numbered in the range from 1 to 15, which were built by Arnold Jung Lokomotivfabrik in Germany in 1904.

Characteristics

Service
Until the railway was completed in 1906, these locomotives also served as construction engines. Since the Otavi railway traversed the Namib Desert, the engines were often seen with rectangular auxiliary water tenders in tow.

During the First World War, the former German Colony came under South African administration and the railways in GSWA came under control of the Union Defence Forces. Control of all railway operations in South West Africa (SWA) was passed on from the Military to the Director of Railways in Windhoek on 1 August 1915. On 1 April 1922, all the railway lines and rolling stock in the territory became part of the South African Railways (SAR), but the SWA locomotives were never reclassified or renumbered and retained their former German identities until they were withdrawn from service.

Two of the Jung locomotives survived into the SAR era, no. 1 and no. 13, the rest by then having either been scrapped or, like no. 9 which is preserved at Tsumeb, sold to industry. Both SAR locomotives had been modified to tank-and-tender engines for use on the Otavi Railway's fast passenger service. Their coal bunkers were removed and they were equipped with tenders, supplied by Henschel and Son, which ran on four-wheeled bogies and had a capacity of  coal and  water. Similar tenders had been fitted to modified Class Ha locomotives.

Works numbers
The locomotive numbers and Jung works numbers are listed in the table.

Illustration

References

0950
0-6-2 locomotives
C1 locomotives
0-6-2T locomotives
Arnold Jung locomotives
600 mm gauge railway locomotives
Railway locomotives introduced in 1904
1922 in South Africa